Kasami may refer to:
Kasami, Iran, a village in Sistan and Baluchestan Province, Iran
Pajtim Kasami, a Swiss footballer
Tadao Kasami, a Japanese information theorist
Kasami code, a line code associated with him